Psorophora cyanescens is a species of mosquito in the family Culicidae.

References

External links

 

Aedini
Articles created by Qbugbot
Insects described in 1902